Bernard Angels (born 18 September 1944) is a member of the Senate of France, representing the Val-d'Oise department. He is a member of the Socialist Party.

References
Page on the Senate website 

1944 births
Living people
Socialist Party (France) politicians
French Senators of the Fifth Republic
Senators of Val-d'Oise
Officiers of the Légion d'honneur
Place of birth missing (living people)